Frank Campbell (March 27, 1858 in Bath, Steuben County, New York – February 20, 1924) was an American banker and politician.

Life
He was the son of Lt. Gov. Robert Campbell and Frances Fowler Campbell. He was educated at Haverling Academy and at Trenton, New Jersey. In 1879, he married Mary Louise Willson (d. 1914), and their son was Willson R. Campbell.

With his brother Clarence he founded the Campbell Brothers Bank in Bath in 1880. After dissolving the partnership, he organized the Farmers & Mechanics Bank of Bath, of which he was Cashier until 1922, and then President until his death.

As a Democrat he was New York State Comptroller from 1892 to 1893, elected in 1891 but defeated for re-election in 1893. He was a delegate to the 1892 Democratic National Convention in Chicago. He was Chairman of the New York State Democratic Committee from 1898 to 1904.

Sources
The History of New York State at www.usgennet.org The History of New York State edited by Dr. James Sullivan (Biographies, Part 23), at usgennet
The Political Graveyard: Index to Politicians: Campbell, E to F at politicalgraveyard.com Political Graveyard

1858 births
1924 deaths
New York State Comptrollers
People from Bath, New York
American bankers